This article lists icons of the Theotokos of St. Theodore having historical or cultural value, or housed in scholarly museums or  collections.

Miracles of icon

References 

Russian icons